The 1796 British general election returned members to serve in the 18th and last House of Commons of the Parliament of Great Britain. They were summoned before the Union of Great Britain and Ireland on 1 January 1801. The members in office in Great Britain at the end of 1800 continued to serve in the first Parliament of the United Kingdom (1801–02).

Political situation
Great Britain had been at war with France since 1792. The Prime Minister since 1783, William Pitt the Younger, led a broad wartime coalition of Whig and Tory politicians.

The principal opposition to Pitt was a relatively weak faction of Whigs, led by Charles James Fox. For four years after 1797 opposition attendance at Westminster was sporadic as Fox pursued a strategy of secession from Parliament. Only a small group, led by George Tierney, had attended frequently to oppose the ministers. As Foord observes "only once did the minority reach seventy-five, and it was often less than ten".

Dates of election
The period between the first and last returns was 25 May to 29 June 1796.

Summary of the constituencies

Monmouthshire (One County constituency with two members and one single member Borough constituency) is included in Wales in these tables. Sources for this period may include the county in England.

Table 1: Constituencies and Members, by type and country

Table 2: Number of seats per constituency, by type and country

Results

Seats summary

See also
 List of parliaments of Great Britain
 List of MPs elected in the 1796 British general election

References

1796 elections
General election
1796